Jacquinot Bay Airport   is an airport near Jacquinot Bay in the East New Britain Province on the island of New Britain in Papua New Guinea. The airstrip was liberated by the Australian Army in 1944, and an airstrip was built by 1945. There is no scheduled airline service.

History

World War II
The Jacquinot Bay area was liberated by the Australian Army on 4 November 1944. The 2/3 Railway Construction Company and the 17th Field Company RAE began construction of an airfield and in February 1945, No. 1 Airfield Construction Squadron expanded the base. The airfield had a single coral  runway.

Royal Australian Air Force units based here included:
No. 79 Squadron operating Mark VIII Spitfires
No. 18 (NEI) Squadron operating North American B-25 Mitchell from February–June 1945
Royal New Zealand Air Force units based here included:
No. 2 Squadron operating Lockheed Venturas from June–September 1945
No. 16 Squadron operating F4Us from August–October 1945
No. 19 Squadron operating F4Us from June–October 1945
No. 20 Squadron operating F4Us from May–August 1945
No. 21 Squadron operating F4Us from May–July 1945

Following the Japanese surrender several Japanese aircraft were flown from Vunakanau Airfield to Jacquinot Bay Airfield.

Postwar
On 15 November 1945 an RAAF C-47 #13339 crashed into a mountain on a flight from Jacquinot Bay to Rabaul, all 28 passengers and crew were killed.

Facilities
The airport has one runway which measures  in length.

References

External links
 Jacquinot Bay Airport
 

Airports in Papua New Guinea
East New Britain Province
Airfields in the Pacific theatre of World War II